Kirta is a legendary Hurrian king. He is traditionally thought to have founded the dynasty of Mitanni, though epigraphic support for that is thin. A seal was found reading "Šuttarna, son of Kirta , king of Maitani." He may have reigned around 1540 BC as per middle chronology. His offsprings included Shuttarna I and Barattarna. 
Mitanni's rise under Kirta might have been facilitated by the disappearance of the Babylonian kingdom.

See also

Mitanni
Legend of Keret

References

Hurrian kings
Mythological kings